Rheinheimera hassiensis is a Gram-negative, rod-shaped and aerobic bacterium from the genus of Rheinheimera which has been isolated from the rhizosphere of the plant Hordeum secalinum from a salt meadow near Münzenberg in Germany.

References 

Chromatiales
Bacteria described in 2014